The Catholic Church of St Oswald and St Edmund Arrowsmith is located on Liverpool Road in Ashton-in-Makerfield, Greater Manchester, England.

Building
The first Catholic church on the site was built in 1822. The old church was demolished and the foundation stone of the new building was laid in 1925.

The present church was constructed in the Romanesque style and completed in 1930, with the architect being J. K. Brocklesby. The bell tower, on the right of the facade is a notable landmark with its green copper pyramid roof that can be seen on the drive into Ashton from Stubshaw Cross. The interior has two saucer domes and an apse. The altar itself has marble flooring and four red carpets. It has four seats either side for the Altar servers to be seated. At the back of the altar is the Tabernacle, and eight candles. Above the altar are stained glass windows of saints designed by Harry Clarke.

The presbytery and the church gates, which both date from 1822, are also Grade II Listed.

Nikolaus Pevsner described the church as "totally outdated" but "ambitious" and "impressive".

Relic
The church houses a holy relic, the hand of St Edmund Arrowsmith, who was one of the Forty Martyrs of England and Wales.

Parish priests
 Canon James O'Meara 1896–1946
 Fr John Joseph McLaughlin 1946–1950
 Canon Robert Wilfrid Meagher 1950–1970
 Canon Francis J Ripley 1970–1991
 Fr Brian Newns 1991–2019
 Fr John Gorman 2019–

See also

Listed buildings in Ashton-in-Makerfield

References

Roman Catholic churches in Greater Manchester
Buildings and structures in the Metropolitan Borough of Wigan
Ashton-in-Makerfield
Roman Catholic Archdiocese of Liverpool